Deogarh, also known as Devgarh, is a town and a municipality, nearby Rajsamand city in Rajsamand District in the Indian state of Rajasthan. Formerly the town was an estate of the Chundawat Rajputs.

Geography 
A small pond rests at its base. The town is bordered by rocks in the east, Kali Ghati (Aravali Range) in the west, Nathdwara Ghats in the south and Ajmer in the north. It has spectacular animal and bird sanctuaries. There are many stone and granite mines and polish factories near the city.

Demographics 
As of the 2011 India census, Deogarh had a population of 17,604 - 8,899 Males and 8,705 females. Deogarh has an average literacy rate of 76.83%, higher than the state average of 66.11%: male literacy is 89.08% and female literacy is 64.38%.

Transport 
The town is located 4 km inside the NH-8 (Mumbai-Delhi Highway), the landmark is Kamlighat. As no broad gauge train is available, roads are often the quickest way of reaching the town. Nearby cities are Udaipur (140 km), Ajmer and Bhilwara. Udaipur also has an airport with regular flights from Delhi and Mumbai.

A train can be taken anywhere between  Mavli Junction to  Marwar Junction. The route between Marwar Junction and Deogarh is scenic.

Places of interest 
Deogarh is a popular tourist destination, boasting a complex of luxurious heritage resorts managed by the erstwhile royal family of the Deogarh thikana.

Apart from the palace there is also a meter gauge train from Deogarh to Marwar Junction which goes through the sanctuary and hills of Kali Ghati, where there are many bridges and tunnels constructed by the British. There are many wild animals in the region, and the plains of Marwar are visible from atop the mountains.

In the heart of the town, is the Kunjbihari Mandir, which is famous for the many bats that live inside the roof of the building. There is one clock tower in the main central chowk (market) of the town at the top of Charbhuja Temple.

Anjaneshwar Mahadev temple is also nearby (around 4–5 km), which is famous for its Sivalinga which formed naturally as a result of rain water dissolving calcium in the rocks. It was formed similarly to the ice sivalinga of Amarnath Temple. The temple is in a mountain cave with a small water body on top of it. The area is a common destination for picnics, and has a view of Deogarh because of its elevation. Situated on the Deogarh–Bhilwara route, it is easily accessible throughout the year.

Other places like Nathdwara, famous for the Shrinath Ji Temple, is just 90 km from Deogarh on the road to Udaipur. Ajmer is also just 150 km away on Jaipur–Delhi Route.

Main occupation 
Deogarh's main employment source is tourism. Locals are often engaged in the farming and stone polishing businesses as well as local handicrafts. Some real estate agencies are trying to develop the surrounding and expanding town.

There is also a government hospital and industrial training institute, which attract people from neighbouring villages.

Rulers 
Rawat Sanga Singh, 1st Rawat of Deogarh 1521–1574.
Rawat Duda Singh, 2nd Rawat of Deogarh 1574–1611. 
Rawat Isar Das, 3rd Rawat of Deogarh 1611–1641. 
Rawat Gokul Das I, 4th Rawat of Deogarh 1641–1669. 
Rawat Dwarka Das (qv)
Kunwar Sabal Singh, he was granted the jagir of Bassi and succeeded there as Rao Sabal Singh of Bassi. 
Kunwar Daulat Singh, he was granted the jagir of DAULATGARH in MOONDKATAI (Martyr in War with Mughal Ranbazz Khan)and get it in honour directly from MAHARANA MEWAR. 
Baisa Udai Kanwar, married Kunwar Padam Singh of Samuja; they had six sons.
Rawat Dwarka Das, 5th Rawat of Deogarh 1669–1706 
Rawat Sangram Singh I, 6th Rawat of Deogarh 1706–1737. 
Rawat Jaswant Singh (qv) 
Kunwar Jai Singh, he was granted the jagir of Sangramgarh and succeeded there as Rawat Jai Singh of Sangramgarh. 
Rawat Jaswant Singh, 7th Rawat of Deogarh 1737–1776. 
Rawat Raghav Das (qv) 
Kunwar Gopal Das. 
Kunwar Gyan Singh, he was granted the jagir of Gyangarh and succeeded there as Rawat Shri Gyan Singh, 1st Rawat Sahib of Gyangarh [cr. ca1800] 
Kunwar Ajit Singh, he was granted the jagir of Kareda. 
Maharani Kundan Kunwar, married Maharaja Sawai Madho Singh II of Jaipur. 
Rawat Raghav Das, 8th Rawat of Deogarh 1776–1786. 
Kunwar Anop Singh. He died aged 22. 
Rawat Gokul Das II (qv) 
Rawat Gokul Das II, 9th Rawat of Deogarh 1786–1821. He died in 1821. 
Rawat Nahar Singh I (qv)
Maharani Shringar Kunwar, married Maharao Kishore Singh II of Kotah. 
Rawat Nahar Singh I, 10th Rawat of Deogarh 1821–1847 
Rawat Ranjit Singh, 11th Rawat of Deogarh 1847–1867. 
Rawat Krishna Singh (qv)
Rawat Krishna Singh, 12th Rawat of Deogarh 1867–1900, born 1847; first married in 1887 to Rani Monghi Kunwarba Sahiba of Dhrangadhra and second marriage to Rani Mertani of Ghanerao. He died in 1900. 
Kunwar Jaswant Singh, married Kunwarani Ajab Kunwar of Badnore, died January 1886. He died in January 1886. 
Kunwar Pratap Singh [Anop Singh], adopted from Sangramgarh. He died before his adoptive father before 1900.
Rawat Vijai Singh (qv) 
Rawat Vijai Singh, 13th Rawat of Deogarh 1900–1943, born 1891, educated at Mayo College, Ajmer; married Rani Nand Kunwar, daughter of Raj Rana Zalim Singh of Delwara. He died in 1943. 
Rawat Sangram Singh II (qv) 
Rani Laxmi Kumari Chundawat, born 24 June 1916, Member of the Rajasthan Legislative Assembly 1962–1971, Member on the Panel of Chairmen, Rajasthan Legislative Assembly; Member of the Rajya Sabha 1972–1978, President of the Rajasthan P.C.C., author of a number of books in Hindi and Rajasthani, married 1934, Rawat Tej Singh of Rawatsar. 
Baisa Khuman Kunwar, married into Bagri. 
Rawat Sangram Singh II, 14th Rawat of Deogarh 1943/1965, married Rani Krishna Kumari of Dumraon. He died 1965. 
Rawat Nahar Singh II (qv) 
Rani Sita Kumari, born 1936 in Deogarh, Udaipur, educated at Sophia Girls College, Ajmer; married 25 June 1955, Raja Bahadur Vishwanath Pratap Singh of Manda, Former Prime Minister of India; they have two sons. 
Thakur Mandhata Singh, educated at Mayo College, Ajmer; married Thakurani Govind Kumari, daughter of Thakur Sahib Sawant Singh of Baneria; they have two children. 
Rawat Nahar Singh II, 15th Rawat of Deogarh.
At present Rao Saheb Veer Bhadra Singh is the 16th Rawat of Deogarh

Famous Personalities 

Pramod Bhandari "Parth" is a poet and lyricist who born in Deogarh. He is writing poetry since the age of 9. He won Rajasthan Sahitya Academy award. His poetry book "Ujake Ke Ankur" won national award. He is a fellow member of Screenwriters Association and writing songs for Bollywood movies. He also has a YouTube Channel which is dedicated to his poems and songs and already crossed 2 million views.

References 
            4. https://wilderindia.wordpress.com/2016/08/08/pramod-bhandari-parth/

External links 
 http://www.mapsofindia.com/india/where-is-devgarh.html 
 http://www.deogarhmahal.com
 https://wilderindia.wordpress.com/2016/08/08/pramod-bhandari-parth/

Cities and towns in Rajsamand district
Tourist attractions in Rajsamand district